Christ Episcopal Church is a historic Episcopal church located in La Crosse, Wisconsin in the Episcopal Diocese of Eau Claire. In 1985, Christ Church was added to the National Register of Historic Places.

History
On June 23, 1850, on top of Grandad Bluff, Father James Lloyd Breck had celebrated the first Episcopal Holy Communion in the La Crosse area. Christ Episcopal Church was founded in 1856.

The congregation had a small neo-gothic church on the same site, but had outgrown it by the late 19th century. The present church was designed by M.S. Detweiler, though he died before its completion. His daughter oversaw its completion in 1899. The church was constructed using limestone from Grandad Bluff and was built in a Romanesque Revival style.

Patrick Augustine served as rector for 16 years.

See also

List of Registered Historic Places in Wisconsin

References

External links
Christ Episcopal Church website

Buildings and structures in La Crosse, Wisconsin
Churches on the National Register of Historic Places in Wisconsin
Episcopal churches in Wisconsin
Churches in La Crosse County, Wisconsin
National Register of Historic Places in La Crosse County, Wisconsin
1856 establishments in Wisconsin
Churches completed in 1899